Heaverham is a hamlet in the Sevenoaks district, in the county of Kent, England.
Nearby is the country estate of St Clere.

Location
It is located about three miles away from the town of Sevenoaks, and around a mile away from the large village of Kemsing. Other nearby settlements include the villages of Ightham and Seal, and the hamlets of Cotman's Ash, Styants Bottom and Crowdleham.

Transport
For transport there is the A225 road, A20 road and A25 roads, with the M26 motorway, M20 motorway and the M25 motorway nearby. There is also Kemsing railway station approximately  half a mile away.

Bibliography
A-Z Great Britain Road Atlas (page 181), 2013,

External links

Hamlets in Kent
Sevenoaks District